Granarolo dell'Emilia is a comune (municipality) in the Metropolitan City of Bologna in the Italian region Emilia-Romagna, located about  northeast of Bologna. It has c. 12,000 inhabitants.

Granarolo dell'Emilia borders the following municipalities: Bentivoglio, Bologna, Budrio, Castel Maggiore, Castenaso, Minerbio.

Dynit, a manga and anime publisher, has its head office in the frazione of Cadriano.

Twin towns — sister cities
Granarolo dell'Emilia is twinned with:

  Bagnères-de-Bigorre, France (1985)

References

External links

 Official website 

Cities and towns in Emilia-Romagna